The Currier Museum of Art is an art museum in Manchester, New Hampshire, in the United States. It features European and American paintings, decorative arts, photographs and sculpture. The permanent collection includes works by Picasso, Matisse, Monet, O'Keeffe, Calder, Scheier and Goldsmith, John Singer Sargent, Frank Lloyd Wright, and Andrew Wyeth. Public programs include tours, live classical music and "Family Days" which include activities for all ages.

The museum maintains two house museums, the Zimmerman House and the Toufic H. Kalil House, both designed by notable architect Frank Lloyd Wright.

History 
The museum, originally known as the Currier Gallery of Art, was founded in 1929 from a bequest of former New Hampshire Governor Moody Currier and his third wife, Hannah Slade Currier.

Currier's will provided for the establishment of an art museum, "for the benefit and advancement of humanity." While not an art collector himself, his funding allowed for the purchase of a great deal of art.

After his third wife's death in 1915, a board of trustees was appointed to carry out the Curriers' wishes that a structure be constructed.  Multiple architectural proposals were entertained and the project was not awarded until 1926 to the New York firm of Tilton and Githens.  In October 1929, the art gallery opened its new facility.
The first director was Maud Briggs Knowlton, one of the first women to be a museum administrator in the United States.  The building was listed on the National Register of Historic Places in 1979.

In 1982, new pavilions, designed by the New York firm Hardy Holzman Pfeiffer, were built to accommodate the museum's growing collections, programs and staff. The Currier Art Center, home to art activities for all ages, was relocated to the adjacent former Women's Aid Home in 1998.

In September 2002, the Gallery changed its name to the Currier Museum of Art, because, in the words of its then-director, it "recognizes the Currier's true mission and clarifies our function for those less familiar with us."

Museum expansion 

On June 30, 2005, as part of the first phase of major renovations, a moving firm moved the historic Kennard House, formerly the location of the museum offices, from Beech Street to Pearl Street. The house was built in 1867 in the Second Empire style, and was home to several of the city's wealthy industrialists.

The museum closed in June 2006 for the duration of the $21.4 million expansion. The construction took 21 months, and the museum reopened to the public as scheduled on March 30, 2008. The addition and renovations received a 2008 Design Honor Award from the New Hampshire chapter of the American Institute of Architects, as well as a "People's Choice Award" through the AIA.

Frank Lloyd Wright houses

Zimmerman House (1951)

The museum operates tours of the nearby Zimmerman House, a Usonian House designed by Frank Lloyd Wright. It is complete with the original furnishings and the owners' fine art collection. The Zimmerman House is the only Wright-designed house in New England open for public tours, which are offered March–December.

The Isadore J. and Lucille Zimmerman House was built in 1950. Wright designed the house, the interiors, all the furniture, the gardens, and even the mailbox. In 1979, the building was listed in the National Register of Historic Places. Dr. and Mrs. Zimmerman left the house to the Currier Museum of Art in 1988. In 1990 it was opened to the public so that visitors could enjoy a private world from the 1950s and 1960s including the Zimmermans' unique collection of modern art, pottery, and sculpture. It is the only Wright home open to the public in New England and one of only several of his Usonian homes open nationwide.

Kalil House (1957)
In 2019, the Currier Museum of Art acquired Kalil House, a second private residence in Manchester designed by Wright, for $970,000. The 1,400-sq.-ft. Kalil House is one of just seven Usonian Automatic glass-and-concrete houses sketched out by the architect. It consists of two bedrooms, two bathrooms, a kitchen and the L-shaped living room with a dining area.

Management

Directors
 1996-2016: Susan Strickler
 Since 2016: Alan Chong

Funding
Upon his death in 2001, trustee Henry Melville Fuller left the Currier Museum $43 million, half designated for the art purchase fund. In 2012, the acquisition budget was at around $35 million.

See also
National Register of Historic Places listings in Hillsborough County, New Hampshire

References

External links 

 

Edward Lippincott Tilton buildings
Art museums and galleries in New Hampshire
Museums in Manchester, New Hampshire
Institutions accredited by the American Alliance of Museums
Art museums established in 1929
1929 establishments in New Hampshire
Buildings and structures on the National Register of Historic Places in New Hampshire
National Register of Historic Places in Manchester, New Hampshire
Museums on the National Register of Historic Places